Berglind Rós Ágústsdóttir (born 28 July 1995) is an Icelandic professional footballer who plays as a defender for KIF Örebro and the Iceland women's national team.

Career
Berglind Rós has been capped for the Iceland national team. She was the captain of Fylkir in 2020. On 18 December 2020, it was announced that Berglind Rós had signed a professional contract for Örebro in the Damallsvenskan.

References

1995 births
Living people
Women's association football defenders
Berglind Ros Agustsdottir
Berglind Ros Agustsdottir
Berglind Ros Agustsdottir
KIF Örebro DFF players
Berglind Ros Agustsdottir
Berglind Ros Agustsdottir
Berglind Ros Agustsdottir
Berglind Ros Agustsdottir
Damallsvenskan players